Yasuhiro Miyamoto (born 30 November 1948) is a Japanese professional golfer.

Miyamoto played on the Japan Golf Tour, winning eight times.

Professional wins (9)

Japan Golf Tour wins (8)

Senior wins (1)
2001 Japan PGA Senior Championship

External links

Japanese male golfers
Japan Golf Tour golfers
Sportspeople from Osaka Prefecture
1948 births
Living people